River lamprey is a common name for several fishes and may refer to:

European river lamprey, Lampetra fluviatilis, native to Europe
Western river lamprey, Lampetra ayresii, native to western North America

See also
Brook lamprey, Lampetra planeri
Lamprey River